H. S. Wilson (born 1946) is Executive Director of Foundation for Theological Education in the Southeast Asia based in Philadelphia.  Wilson is widely known in India for his contribution to theological education in India as Director (1980 through 1988) of Research and Church Relations at the Board of Theological Education of the Senate of Serampore College, Bangalore, the theological arm of the Senate of Serampore College (University), the nation's first University

Studies
Wilson studied at St. Aloysius College (Mangalore) obtaining a degree in Commerce (B. Com.) from the University of Mysore.  He had his ministerial formation at the United Theological College, Bangalore as a candidate of the United Basel Mission between 1967-1970 where he obtained a Bachelor of Divinity (B. D.) entitling his graduate thesis as An Impact of Protestant Christianity of the Religious, Social, and Cultural Aspect of Tuluva Community in South Kanara.  Later, the University under the Registrarship of Chetti Devasahayam awarded him with a degree.

From 1970-1972 he pursued a Master of Arts (M. A.) degree from Karnataka University and then went over to Princeton, New Jersey to study for a postgraduate degree in Theology taking a Master of Theology (Th.M.) degree from the Princeton Theological Seminary and continued his studies up to research level by enrolling at the Drew University obtaining a Doctor of Philosophy (Ph.D.) degree in 1977 where he submitted a thesis entitled The Speaking God: Luther's Theology of Preaching done under the guidance of Professors Bard Thompson, James Pain and Charles L. Rice.

Writings

Books
 1977, The Speaking God: Luther's Theology of Preaching.
 1988 (Edited), The Church on the Move: A Quest to Affirm the Biblical Faith - Essays in honour of P. Victor Premasagar
 1990 (Edited), Moving Communities in Mission: Consultation on Vision for Equipping the Local Congregations in Mission
 1996 (Edited), Pastoral Theology from a Global Perspective: A Case Study Approach

Articles
 1986, Involvement of the Wesleyan Kanarese Mission in the Mysore Territory in the Nineteenth Century,
 1989, The Puebla document and the Church's commitment to the poor and the oppressed,
 1989, Bible as People's Book: Experiences of the Basic Christian Communities,
 2000, Need to forgive for a new relationship: A relevant 'Crucipraxis' for today
 2004, Distance Education: A Challenge to Theological Education,
 2005, Luther on Preaching as God Speaking,
 2006, Role of the Theological Educator in a Multicultural Context
 2015, Transcending exclusive claims about God: A plea to pursue binding relations among the followers of Abrahamic faith heritage.

Ecclesiastical career

Pastoral ministry
As a ministerial candidate of the United Basel Mission, Wilson pastored at the United Basel Mission Church in Mumbai from 1973-1974.  During his overseas study, he was Youth Pastor at the Arcola Methodist Church, New Jersey.  From 1978-1979, he was Honorary Associate Presbyter at CSI-St. Andrew's Church, Bangalore.

Although Wilson belonged to the Basel Mission which had unionized itself into the Church of South India in 1968, he continued to be in the fold of the United Basel Mission.  The ecclesiastical unification of the erstwhile Basel Mission did not go well with the congregations resulting in undecided allegiance, an act which resulted in chaos due to poor management.  Wilson took some time to decide his allegiance and eventually came into the fold of the Church of South India resulting in his ordination on 19 November 1978 at CSI-St. Paul’s Church, Mangalore by S. R. Furtado then Bishop - in - Karnataka Southern Diocese.

Teaching ministry

India
After Wilson completed his doctoral studies, he returned to India and took up a teaching assignment at the United Theological College, Bangalore and taught from 1977 to 1988 serving under two Principals, J. R. Chandran and E. C. John.  For a year (1989), he served as Ecumenical Relations Director he moved to the Church of South India Synod on the invitation of the Moderator, Victor Premasagar.

Overseas
From 1989 to 1998, Wilson was at Geneva serving as Executive Secretary, Department of Theology, World Alliance of Reformed Churches, Geneva.  Again from 1998 to 2003, Wilson was Wilhelm Loehe Associate Professor of World Mission at the Wartburg Theological Seminary, Dubuque.  From 2003 to 2006, Wilson was H. George Anderson Professor of Mission and Cultures at the Lutheran Theological Seminary at Philadelphia.

Contribution to theological education

India
During Wilson's stint at the BTESSC from 1980-1988, he ensured that budding theologians were recognised and sent for higher theological education, both locally and internationally to sustain its continuity in India.  At the same time, research and publishing were carried on at BTESSC in a manner benefiting theological education.  Vernacular language bibliographies were edited during Wilson's tenure at BTESSC along with Hunter P. Mabry and Zaihmingthanga, resulting in compilations titled Bibliography of Original Christian Writings (respective language).  One such bibliography compiled by Ravela Joseph and B. Suneel Bhanu has been a source book for original Christian writings through which successive Theologians have used these compilations to increase their scholarship and research.

Global
As Executive Director of the Foundation for Theological Education in the Southeast Asia based in Philadelphia, Wilson has been in the forefront of advancement of theological education both in mainland China as well as its neighbouring countries in South East Asia.

References

Christian clergy from Karnataka
Kannada people
20th-century Christian clergy
Indian Anglican priests
Indian Christian theologians
Senate of Serampore College (University) alumni
Princeton Theological Seminary alumni
Drew University alumni
Living people
Church of South India clergy
Academic staff of the Senate of Serampore College (University)
1946 births